River Buddy Butcher (born Rhea Harriett Butcher; August 12, 1982) is an American stand-up comedian, actor, writer, producer, and podcast host. Butcher is best known for personal, observational comedy focused on his vegetarianism, feminism, love of baseball, and experiences as a queer person.

Early life 
Butcher was raised in the Kenmore neighborhood of Akron, Ohio, an only child whose parents divorced when Butcher was one month old. He attended Our Lady of the Elms High School and graduated from Archbishop Hoban High School in 2001.

While attending the University of Akron, Butcher worked at a skateboard shop named Summer Squall and an indoor skating facility called Joe's Skate Park, and helped design a skatepark that opened in Akron in 2001. He graduated from the University of Akron with a degree in printmaking in 2005. Butcher attended graduate school at University of Notre Dame.

In 2006, Butcher had an exhibit at a printmaker’s show called "Prints at an Exposition".<ref name= art>Shinn, Dorothy (February 5, 2006). "Stellar Printmakers Put Stamp on Exhibit: Summit Artspace Has Local Artists Showcasing Fresh Approaches to Art". Akron Beacon Journal":(Akron, Ohio). p. E4.</ref> This exhibit, which was a series of prints on muslin showing the body's organs, was inspired by his own appendectomy.

 Comedy career 
 Early years 
Butcher began his comedy career performing improv in Chicago at The Second City and has since performed stand-up at clubs including Zanies, the Jukebox, and Flappers, as well as Chicago Underground Comedy, The Hideout, The Lincoln Lodge, UCB, Cole's, and Meltdown.Jung, E. Alex (August 16, 2016). "Cameron Esposito and Rhea Butcher on Take My Wife, 'The Show Where Lesbians Don’t Die'". Vulture. Retrieved May 31, 2017. He made his late night debut on Conan in June 2016."Late Night". The Times Herald-Record (Middletown, New York). June 30, 2016. p. 22.

 2014–present 
In the fall of 2014, Butcher appeared alongside Cameron Esposito in a series of videos for BuzzFeed Motion Pictures titled "Ask a Lesbian".Star, Erika (February 20, 2013). "Lez Stand Out: Rhea Butcher and Cameron Esposito". AfterEllen. Butcher and Esposito also co-hosted the web series "She Said" for Amy Poehler's Smart Girls Network. The two wrote and starred together again in Take My Wife, on the comedy streaming service Seeso.Yohannes, Alamin (August 29, 2016). "Cameron Esposito, Rhea Butcher Talk Comedy, Diversity and 'Take My Wife'". NBC News. Retrieved May 31, 2017. Butcher also co-hosted the stand-up comedy podcast Put Your Hands Together with Cameron Esposito, which was recorded weekly in front of a live audience at the Upright Citizens Brigade Theater in Los Angeles until it ended in July 2019.Rapa, Patrick (December 6, 2016). "L.A. standup comic Cameron Esposito diversifies her portfolio". The Philadelphia Inquirer.

His first comedy album Butcher was released in August 2016 by the independent record label Kill Rock Stars.Heldenfels, Rich (August 21, 2016). "New Album, Show for Comedian Rhea Butcher: Akron Native Returns to Area for Local Appearance, CD Signing". Akron Beacon Journal (Akron, Ohio). p. E1. The set was performed at Mississippi Studios in Portland, Oregon. It debuted at number one on iTunes.

In 2016, he appeared in 8 episodes of the first season of Adam Ruins Everything. He returned in 2017 for one additional appearance.

In 2018, he started hosting a baseball-focused podcast called Three Swings.

In 2021, he appeared on Comedy Central Stand Up Presenting called A Different Kind of Dude.

As stated in an interview, Butcher said his strongest comedy influences are Rosie O'Donnell, Ellen DeGeneres, Brett Butler, Elayne Boosler, Maria Bamford, and Paul F. Tompkins.

 Voice acting 
Butcher provided the voice for Asher, a fictional nonbinary character, for three episodes of the second season of the animated series Kipo and the Age of Wonderbeasts, released in 2020.

 Personal life 
Butcher met fellow comedian Cameron Esposito at an open mic hosted by Esposito. The two soon started collaborating and then began to date. On December 12, 2015, Butcher and Esposito married onstage at The Hideout in Esposito's hometown of Chicago, Illinois. In August 2018, Butcher and Esposito announced their separation to "live individual lives." Their split was covered in a Vanity Fair article. In September 2019, Esposito wrote an article for the New York Times discussing the couple's pending divorce.

Butcher is a trans man and uses he and they'' pronouns. In November 2021, Butcher announced that he had changed his name to River. Butcher is dating musician MaryLeigh Roohan.

Butcher is a member of the Democratic Socialists of America. He endorsed Kenneth Mejia and Eunisses Hernandez during the 2022 Los Angeles elections.

Notable appearances

References

External links 

1982 births
Living people
21st-century American actors
American stand-up comedians
American television actors
Actors from Akron, Ohio
Feminist comedians
Transgender comedians
LGBT people from Ohio
American non-binary actors
21st-century American comedians
Members of the Democratic Socialists of America
Non-binary writers
Non-binary comedians
Transgender male actors
University of Akron alumni
American LGBT comedians